The fifth season of the Reborn! anime series broadcast episodes 102 to 140 between October 4, 2008 and July 4, 2009 on TV Tokyo. Titled as Katekyō Hitman Reborn! in Japan, the Japanese television series is directed by Kenichi Imaizumi, and produced and animated by Artland.  The plot, based on the Reborn! manga by Akira Amano, follows Tsunayoshi "Tsuna" Sawada, the future boss of the infamous Vongola Mafia family, and his friends after they are sent into the future. In this future, nearly ten years after their own time, they are faced with the Millefiore Family, a threat to the Vongola and the world. This season begins with the main characters invading a Millefiore base. 

Six pieces of theme music are used for the episodes: two opening themes and four ending themes. The opening themes are Masami Mitsuoka's "Last Cross", used from episode 102 to 126, and "Easy Go" by Kazuki Kato from episode 127.

Marvelous Entertainment has released the season into ten DVD compilations labeled as "X-Burn" volumes between April 24, 2009 and January 29, 2010. On March 21, 2009, Japan's d-rights production company collaborated with the anime-streaming website called Crunchyroll in order to begin streaming subbed episodes of the Japanese-dubbed series worldwide. New episodes are available to everyone a week after its airing in Japan.


Episode list

References 
General
 
 
 
Specific

External links 
 Official Reborn! website 
 Official anime website 
 TV Tokyo's official anime website 

2008 Japanese television seasons
2009 Japanese television seasons
Season 5